Dawson Millward (July 13, 1870 – May 15, 1926) was a British stage and film actor.

Selected filmography
 Caste (1915)
 General Post (1920)
 The Magistrate (1921)
 The Skin Game (1921)
 The Recoil (1922)
 King of the Castle (1925)
 One Colombo Night (1926)

Selected stage appearances
 The White Heather (1897)
 The Eleventh Commandment'' (1922)

References

External links

1870 births
1926 deaths
Male actors from London
English male film actors
English male stage actors
20th-century English male actors